Kristina Murrin CBE, née Hunt, is an Australian-born United Kingdom-based innovator and former policy advisor to both the Blair and Cameron governments. Between 2010-2013 she jointly led the twelve-person policy and implementation team at No. 10 Downing Street.

Early life and education

Murrin was born in Sydney, Australia, but moved to the UK when she was 12. Her father, John Hunt, was Emeritus Professor of Organisational Behaviour at the London Business School. Her sister is Jay Hunt, head of Apple TV Europe.

Murrin was educated at the independent Lady Eleanor Holles School in Hampton, West London, followed by St John's College at the University of Cambridge, where she read Social and Political Sciences.

Career
Murrin started her career as a marketing trainee at Procter and Gamble, before ending up as Brand Manager for household names such as Old Spice and Crest.  In 2002, she left to become one of the early partners in the innovation business, What If. She helped build it into the world's largest independent innovation consultancy.

Between 2001-2006, Murrin served as an associate of Tony Blair's Prime Minister’s Delivery Unit. The Unit was tasked with monitoring progress of the government’s Public Service Agreements (PSAs).

In 2007 she was appointed as non-executive Director of the newly formed Department for Universities, Innovation, and Skills, helping to oversee its £20 billion budget.

She sold her share in What If, in 2008, and took up a role as Senior Fellow at the Institute for Government. In 2010, Murrin was appointed as Director of Implementation at No10 Downing Street, a new post created to monitor departmental business plans, and to track and report on their progress, to the Prime Minister. Radically, Murrin chose to publish monthly reports stating which departments and ministers were on track with major policy implementations, and which were falling behind. It was a position which she held through a period of structural change, until leaving in January 2013.

Murrin has served as a fellow of the Institute for government in London and as a Fellow at the Blavatnik School of Government Oxford University,. In 2017 she led a Government review into Innovation in the Ministry of Defence

In 2018 she was appointed CEO of the National Leadership Centre.

Murrin was appointed Commander of the Order of the British Empire (CBE) in the 2014 New Year Honours for services to the Prime Minister's Office.

Books
Alongside her corporate and governmental career, Murrin has also authored four books:
How to Start a Creative Revolution
What Worries Parents
Healthy Happy Children
Honey, We're Killing the Kids
Honey, We're Killing the Kids was also turned into a BBC TV programme, which Murrin hosted for three series. She also presented the Channel 4 environmental programme, The Woman Who Stops Traffic.

Personal
She is married and has three children. She lives in London.

References

Living people
Advisors
Commanders of the Order of the British Empire
People from Sydney
Australian emigrants to England
Australian expatriates in England
Year of birth missing (living people)